Assaad Wajdi Razzouk (born in 1964 in Beirut, Lebanon) is a Lebanese-British clean-energy entrepreneur, author, podcaster and commentator.

Biography
Razzouk is Chief Executive Officer of Gurīn Energy,  which he co-founded in 2021. Gurīn Energy is a renewable energy development platform headquartered in Singapore which focuses on greenfield renewable projects across Asia.

His début book, “Saving the Planet Without the Bullshit”  was published in 2022 by Atlantic Books. Razzouk is also the host of The Angry Clean Energy Guy podcast.

Previously, Razzouk was Chairman and Chief Executive Officer of Sindicatum Renewable Energy, which he co-founded in 2005. Sindicatum (Singapore) is a developer, owner and operator of clean energy projects in Asia. From 1993 to 2002, Razzouk was an investment banker at Nomura International plc in London, where he was successively Head of the Middle East Group (1993-1997), Head of Corporate Finance – Emerging Markets (1997-1999), Head of Corporate Finance – Financial Institutions, Communications and Technology (1999-2001) and Deputy Head, Global Corporate Finance (2001-2002).

He founded South East Asia's first Middle Eastern contemporary art gallery, Sana Gallery in Singapore.

Education
Razzouk is a graduate of Syracuse University (summa cum laude) and holds an MBA from Columbia University in New York and a Doctor of Philosophy (Ph.D.) Honoris Causa in Climate Change, Sustainable Development and International Cooperation from Teri University in India.

Memberships
He is a board member of ClientEarth, an environmental group using the law to protect Earth and its inhabitants; a board member of EB Impact, a Singapore-based non-profit organization that provides trainings and programs to Asia Pacific’s underserved communities; and is affiliated with Washington, D.C.’s Middle East Institute as an Expert at the Middle East – Asia Project. 
He also serves on the Advisory Board of media group Eco-Business and on the International Council of the National University of Singapore School of Medicine.

Bibliography
 Saving the Planet Without the Bullshit (2022, Atlantic Books)

Awards
Razzouk won the Association for Sustainable & Responsible Investment in Asia (ASrIA)'s "Most Progressive Corporate Leader" award in 2011. 
Razzouk was also named among the Top 50 Low-Carbon Pioneers by CNBC Business in June 2007 and among the Top 600 Most Powerful People in Finance by Global Finance in September 1998. Razzouk was chosen among the world's 20 most influential CEOs on Twitter by INSEAD in May 2016, a list also including leaders such as Tim Cook, Bill Gates, Elon Musk and Richard Branson.

Under Razzouk's leadership, Sindicatum Sustainable Resources Group won the 2013 Commodity Business Awards for Excellence in Emission Markets and a Special Commendation for Excellence in Market Policy and Advisory. In 2012, Sindicatum won the Energy Institute ‘Energy Excellence’ Award for its Duerping Project in China in 2012. Sindicatum's Duerping Project was designed to optimise energy recovery from waste gas extracted from a coal mine that was previously vented to the atmosphere. Sindicatum Sustainable Resources Group also won the 2012 Commodity Business Award for Excellence in Renewable Energy Markets, as well as special commendations for Excellence in Emission Markets and Excellence in Policy and Advisory.

In 2011, Sindicatum Sustainable Resources Group won the Commodity Business Award for Excellence in Renewable Energy Markets, as well as a Special Commendation in the Commodity Market Policy & Advisory category. Sindicatum Sustainable Resources Group also won two Green Business Awards, for excellence in the Renewable Energy and Carbon Reduction categories in 2011.

References

External links

Sindicatum Renewable Energy
Sana Gallery
The Daily Star, Beirut, Lebanon, October 20, 2012.
ASrIA
Biography of Razzouk at The Independent (archived from original), September 17, 2012.
Bloomberg News, December 7, 2011.
Bloomberg News, January 25, 2011.
Razzouk for Reuters: Kyoto carbon scheme needs Americans (archived from original), November 20, 2009.
Eco-Business

1964 births
Living people
Sustainable energy
Climate activists
Non-fiction environmental writers
British non-fiction writers
British male writers
Male non-fiction writers
Syracuse University alumni
Columbia University alumni
Lebanese non-fiction writers
21st-century Lebanese businesspeople
Businesspeople from Beirut
Lebanese people of Arab descent
Lebanese emigrants to the United Kingdom
British people of Lebanese descent
Lebanese businesspeople
British businesspeople